Golden Kingdom is a 2015 drama film directed by Brian Perkins. The film tells the story of four young Buddhist monks and their life in a Buddhist monastery. The film is set and filmed entirely on location in Myanmar. Golden Kingdom is the first international feature film produced in Myanmar since its recent reopening.

Synopsis
Nestled in the mountains of Myanmar, sits a Buddhist monastery inhabited by Sayadaw, the abbot of the monastery, and four young monks; Koyin Witazara, Koyin Wezananda, Koyin Thiridema and Koyin Awadadema. One day, Sayadaw learns that he must travel away on personal matters and leave the monastery for a while and leave the four young monks alone to fend for themselves. Before he leaves, he puts Koyin Witazara, the eldest of the group, in charge. With Sayadaw gone, the four struggle to put food on the table while confronting their fears and internal demons.

Characters
 Sayadaw (U Zawtica)
 Koyin Witazara (Shine Htet Zaw)
 Koyin Wezananda (Koyin Saw Ri)
 Koyin Thiridema (Koyin Than Maung)
 Koyin Awadadema (Koyin Maung Sein)

Production
The film was filmed on location in Myanmar.

Three of the four young monks depicted in the film are real-life apprentice monks while U Zawtica who play Sayadaw is also himself a real-life Buddhist sayadaw.

References

External links

Films set in Myanmar
Films about Buddhism
Films shot in Myanmar